Coincya monensis is a plant species in the family Brassicaceae. Coincya monensis is native to western Europe and Morocco, but has been introduced in North America.

Subspecies

It contains the subspecies:

 C. monensis subsp. cheiranthos  (Wallflower Cabbage) — France, Germany & Spain
 C. monensis subsp. hispida  — central Portugal & central Spain
  C. monensis subsp. monensis (Isle of Man cabbage) — the British Isles
 C. monensis subsp. nevadensis  — southern Spain
 C. monensis subsp. orophila  — Morocco, Portugal & Spain
 C. monensis subsp. puberula  — northern Portugal & northern Spain
  C. monensis subsp. recurvata  (Star mustard) — United States

References

monensis
Plants described in 1753
Taxa named by Carl Linnaeus
Taxobox binomials not recognized by IUCN